The Roman Catholic Diocese of Jalingo is a diocese located in the city of Jalingo, which is in Taraba State and in the Ecclesiastical province of Jos in Nigeria.

History
 February 3, 1995: Established as Diocese of Jalingo from the Diocese of Yola

Special churches
The Cathedral is Our Lady Queen of Peace Shavou-Mile Six, Jalingo.

Leadership
 Bishops of Jalingo
 Bishop Ignatius Ayau Kaigama (1995.02.03 – 2000.04.14), appointed Archbishop of Jos
 Bishop James Naanman Daman, O.S.A. (2000.12.05 – 2007.06.02), appointed Bishop of Shendam
 Bishop Charles Hammawa, since 16 April 2008

See also
Roman Catholicism in Nigeria

Sources
 GCatholic.org Information
 Catholic Hierarchy

Roman Catholic dioceses in Nigeria
Christian organizations established in 1995
Roman Catholic dioceses and prelatures established in the 20th century
Roman Catholic Ecclesiastical Province of Jos